WLLY (1350 kHz) is a commercial AM radio station broadcasting a Southern Gospel music format in Wilson, North Carolina. The station is owned by Estuardo Valdemar Rodriguez and Leonor Rodriguez, Joint Tenants.

History
WLLY signed on in 1961.  It was originally owned by Epperson Stations, with Harry Epperson, Jr. as the principal owner.  WLLY was, for most of its early history, a daytimer. To avoid interfering with other stations on AM 1350, it was required to go off the air at night. In the 1980s, it was given Federal Communications Commission permission to stay on the air around the clock, but at reduced power at night at 79 watts.

Up to the 1980s, it had a country music format and was an ABC Entertainment Network affiliate. By the 1990s, it had shifted to a Christian radio and Southern Gospel format.

References

External links
 

LLY (AM)